Makoura Keita (born 1 November 1994) is a Guinean sprinter. She competed in the women's 100 metres event at the 2016 Summer Olympics, where she finished fourth in her heat with a time of 12.66 seconds. She did not advance to the quarterfinals.

In 2019, she represented Guinea at the 2019 African Games held in Rabat, Morocco. She competed in the women's 100 metres and she finished in 39th place in the heats.

References

External links
 

1994 births
Living people
Guinean female sprinters
Place of birth missing (living people)
Athletes (track and field) at the 2016 Summer Olympics
Olympic athletes of Guinea
Athletes (track and field) at the 2019 African Games
African Games competitors for Guinea
People from Boké Region
Olympic female sprinters